The women's heptathlon event at the 2007 Pan American Games was held on July 24–25.

Medalists

Results

100 metres hurdles
Wind:Heat 1: −0.4 m/s, Heat 2: −0.6 m/s

High jump

Shot put

200 metres
Wind:Heat 1: −0.4 m/s, Heat 2: −0.5 m/s

Long jump

Javelin throw

800 metres

Final results

References
Official results

Heptathlon
2007
2007 in women's athletics